Rafael Iglesias may refer to:

 Rafael Iglesias (bobsleigh), Argentine Olympic bobsledder
 Rafael Iglesias (boxer) (1924–1999), Argentinian boxer and heavyweight gold medal winner at the 1948 Olympics
 Rafael Iglesias (athlete) (born 1979), Spanish long distance runner
 Rafael Iglesias (sailor) (1905-?), Argentine Olympian

See also 
 Rafael Yglesias (born 1954), US novelist
 Rafael Yglesias Castro (1861–1924), president of Costa Rica, 1894–1902